Viatcheslav is a given name. Notable people with the name include:

Viatcheslav Artachine (born in Moscow), Russian rugby league player
Viatcheslav Bobrik (born 1971), Russian former road bicycle racer
Viatcheslav Botchkarev (born 1968), former Soviet sport shooter
Viatcheslav Djavanian (born 1969), former Russian cyclist
Viatcheslav Ekimov (born 1966), nicknamed Eki, Russian former professional racing cyclist
Viatcheslav Gorpichin (born 1970), Russian team handball player and Olympic champion from 2000 in Sydney
Viatcheslav Moshe Kantor (born 1953), international public figure, Jewish leader, businessman, peace activist and philanthropist
Viatcheslav Koleichuk (born 1941), Russian sound artist, musician, architect and visual artist
Grand Duke Viatcheslav Konstantinovich (1862–1879), Romanov grand duke, son of Grand Duke Constantine Nicholaevich of Russia
Viatcheslav Krendelev (born 1982), Russian-Turkmenistani footballer
Viatcheslav Mukhanov (born 1956), Soviet/Russian theoretical physicist and cosmologist
Viatcheslav Nazarov (1952–1996), world-class jazz trombonist, pianist, and vocalist
Viatcheslav Osnos (1935–2009), Russian chess player, trainer and author
Viatcheslav Pozdniakov (born 1978), Russian fencer, won bronze Olympic medal in the team foil competition at the 2004 Summer Olympics
Viatcheslav Repin (born 1960), French writer of Russian extraction
Viatcheslav Sinkevich, Russian swimmer
Viatcheslav Voinov (born 1990), Russian professional ice hockey defenceman

See also
Viacheslav